Liberty Green may refer to:

Liberty Green Historic District, in Clinton, Connecticut
Liberty Green (Louisville, Kentucky), a redevelopment housing project in Phoenix Hill, Louisville neighborhood